Mamarumo Marokane (born c. 1997) is a South African actor and presenter. She known for her appearances in Shadow and MTV Shuga.

Early life
Marokane was born in about 1997 tafelkop Limpopo province. She studied at CityVarsity School of Media and Creative Arts. She can speak English, Sepedi and Setswana.

Career

Currently she play Vuvu on Scandal with two children from previous boyfriend called Nhlamulo. 
Marokane gained prominence through her appearances in the Netflix series Shadow and on MTV Shuga where she plays Dineo.

In February 2020, Marokane was named one of four rising stars by Pearl Thusi in Cosmopolitan South Africa. She joined a number of celebrities for a nightly mini series titled MTV Shuga Alone Together highlighting the problems of Coronavirus on 20 April 2020.

References

South African television actresses
Living people
1990s births
Year of birth uncertain
21st-century South African actresses